Vellinge Airfield , also known as Vellinge-Söderslätt Airfield, is an airport in Vellinge, Sweden, run by Söderslätts Aviation Club. The club has about 80 members and owns one PA-28-180, one Evektor EV-97 Eurostar (Ultralight) and one Aerospool WT-9 Dynamic. The aviation club and airport was previously located at the Trelleborg/Maglarp airport located just a few hundred meters to the north, but was forced to relocate in 2003. The airport is active year-round, weather permitting, with school flights as well as a number of privately own aircraft operating from the airport.

See also
 List of the largest airports in the Nordic countries

References
 Söderslätts Flygklubb 
 Briefing 

Airports in Sweden